Franz Ceska (born 31 January 1936 in Vienna) is an Austrian diplomat. He was Ambassador to Belgium from 1982 to 1988, Permanent Representative to the United Nations in Geneva from 1988 to 1991, Secretary General of the Federation of Austrian Industry from 1992 to 1997, and Ambassador to France from 1997 to 2001.

Ceska studied law at the University of Vienna, earning a doctorate. He subsequently attended the College of Europe in Bruges from 1958 to 1959, and immediately afterwards joined the Foreign Ministry.

References 

1936 births
Ambassadors of Austria to Belgium
Ambassadors of Austria to France
Permanent Representatives of Austria to the United Nations
College of Europe alumni
Diplomats from Vienna
University of Vienna alumni
Living people